Statistics of Soviet Top League for the 1979 season.

Overview
1979 Top League was composed of 18 teams, the championship was won by Spartak Moscow.

On 11 August 1979, a mid-air collision killed virtually the entire FC Pakhtakor Tashkent team. The Top League ordered all the other teams to make three players available for a draft to restock the team, and Pakhtakor was given exemption from relegation for the next three years.

League standings

Results

Top scorers
26 goals
 Vitali Starukhin (Shakhtar)

17 goals
 Sergey Andreyev (SKA Rostov-on-Don)
 Oleg Blokhin (Dynamo Kyiv)
 Khoren Hovhannisyan (Ararat)
 Valeriy Petrakov (Lokomotiv Moscow)

16 goals
 Yuri Chesnokov (CSKA Moscow)
 Vladimir Kazachyonok (Zenit)

14 goals
 Aleksandr Prokopenko (Dinamo Minsk)
 Georgi Yartsev (Spartak Moscow)
 Nikolai Vasilyev (Torpedo Moscow)

References
Soviet Union - List of final tables (RSSSF)

Soviet Top League seasons
1
Soviet
Soviet